Vanguard Recording Society is an American record label set up in 1950 by brothers Maynard and Seymour Solomon in New York City. It was a primarily classical label at its peak in the 1950s and 1960s, but also has a catalogue of recordings by a number of pivotal jazz, folk, and blues musicians. The Bach Guild was a subsidiary label.

The label was acquired by Concord Bicycle Music in April 2015.

History
The newly founded venture's first record was of J.S. Bach's 21st cantata, Ich hatte viel Bekümmernis, BWV 21 ("I had much grief"), with Jonathan Sternberg conducting the tenor Hugues Cuénod and other soloists, chorus and orchestra. "What speaks for the Solomons' steadfastness in their taste and their task", wrote a Billboard journalist in November 1966, "is that this record is still alive in the catalogue (SC-501). As Seymour says, it was a good performance, not easy to top. Of the whole Vanguard/Bach Guild catalogue, numbering about 480 issues, 30 are Bach records..." The label also recorded other baroque and earlier works, pieces from the English Madrigal School performed by the Deller Consort, Italian and French madrigal masterpieces, Elizabethan and Jacobean music, and Henry Purcell.

In 1953, under the direction of John Hammond, the company began the Jazz Showcase series that concentrated on mainstream jazz, producing about two dozen recordings before it was closed in 1958. Recordings made at the Spirituals to Swing concerts in 1938 and 1939 were released by Vanguard in 1959. The company only intermittently pursued recording jazz after that.

In the mid-1950s Vanguard signed blacklisted performers Paul Robeson and the Weavers. It continued to issue folk music with newly signed artists Joan Baez, Hedy West, the Rooftop Singers, Buffy Sainte-Marie, Ian and Sylvia, and Mimi and Richard Fariña.

In the summer of 1965, Maynard Solomon hired Samuel Charters to edit the tapes of the 1964 Newport Folk Festival. Following that project, the company sent Charters to Chicago to capture the broad range of blues musicians there. Those sessions resulted in the 1966 three-album series titled Chicago/The Blues/Today!. The albums included Junior Wells with Buddy Guy, Muddy Waters's bandmates Otis Spann and James Cotton, Otis Rush, Homesick James, Johnny Shines, Big Walter Horton, and Charlie Musselwhite.

Vanguard released numerous classical recordings, both domestically produced and imported. Many of the latter came from the United Kingdom's Pye Records label, featuring performances by the Halle Orchestra conducted by Sir John Barbirolli. The recordings were so exceptional that many classical radio stations programmed them. Vanguard even released some quadraphonic classical recordings in the early 1970s, including a performance of Tchaikovsky's Fourth Symphony with the American Symphony Orchestra conducted by Leopold Stokowski. The label also released many performances by the Utah Symphony Orchestra conducted by Maurice Abravanel, including one of the first sets of the complete ten symphonies of Gustav Mahler, a complete performance of The Nutcracker, as well as the earlier P.D.Q. Bach recordings, from 1965 to 1983. Vanguard was the first American label to release the complete 1944 high fidelity recordings of composer Richard Strauss conducting the Vienna Philharmonic Orchestra in most of his tone poems; the recordings were made on the Magnetophon tape recording equipment in the Vienna Opera House.

The multiplicity of popular in-house classical music series released by the Solomons on Vanguard and Bach Guild between 1950 and 1966 include, in addition to 22 Bach cantatas, the virtuoso trumpet, virtuoso flute and virtuoso oboe, along with German University Songs with Erich Kunz, songs of the Auvergne, Viennese dances with Willi Boskovsky, traditional songs by Roland Hayes, Vivaldi's Four Seasons and other concertos from I Solisti di Zagreb, music by Ralph Vaughan Williams, numerous Haydn symphonies performed by the Esterhazy Orchestra, a double LP of Gluck's opera Orfeo ed Euridice sung in Italian with the Vienna State Opera Orchestra led by Charles Mackerras, and an influential Mahler cycle with the Utah Symphony Orchestra conducted by Maurice Abravanel.

After entering the rock and roll market by signing Country Joe and the Fish, Vanguard started a 6500 series for releases by rock acts but had little success. By the early 1970s, with acts such as Joan Baez and Ian & Sylvia leaving for other labels, and disappointing sales for the "Everyman" budget classical series, Vanguard's stature in the music industry was diminished. The label stayed minimally active with specialty releases such as those by Indian classical musician and sarod virtuoso Vasant Rai. An unexpected novelty hit on Vanguard, "Shaving Cream" by Benny Bell, led the company to release albums of humorous music inspired by Dr. Demento. In the late 1970s Tom Paxton issued two albums, New Songs from the Briar-patch and Heroes, on the label. A few disco albums by acts such as Players Association, Alphone Mouzon's "Poussez",  and Marcus Barone's "The Ring/Savage Lover"  were released on Vanguard with both domestic and worldwide chart impact.

After this period of near-dormancy, Vanguard was sold to the Welk Music Group in 1985. The Welk Group sold the classical music catalog back to Seymour Solomon. Welk Music Group revitalized the label, reissuing much of its extensive folk and popular music back catalogue (a good deal of which had been out of print for several years) on CD, as well as signing a number of new artists (such as Matt Nathanson, Mindy Smith, Greg Laswell, and Trevor Hall), in addition to established musicians such as Merle Haggard, John Fogerty, Chris Isaak, Robert Cray, Shawn Mullins, and Linda Ronstadt. The label also formed marketing partnerships with a number of artist-run label imprints, to include Levon Helm (Dirt Farmer Music), Indigo Girls (IG Recording), and Chely Wright (Painted Red Music), among others. This era for Vanguard also garnered the label three consecutive Grammy Awards for Levon Helm, multiple Grammy Awards for Robert Cray, and an RIAA certified platinum single for Matt Nathanson's "Come on Get Higher." In 2008, Welk Music Group began a distribution deal with EMI to handle its labels, including Vanguard.

After Seymour Solomon's death, Vanguard Classics was sold to Artemis Records, which reactivated the company with new releases by Leon Fleisher and Gil Shaham. When Artemis folded in 2004, the Vanguard Classics catalogue was sold to Sheridan Square Entertainment, which is licensing the Vanguard Classics material. Sheridan Square eventually became IndieBlu, which was acquired by Entertainment One in 2010. Vanguard Music Group was acquired by Concord Bicycle Music in April 2015., Concord's Craft Recordings unit manages the Vanguard catalog.

Vanguard used the Brooklyn Masonic Temple in New York City as one of its recording studios for many of its sessions.

Roster

Classical artists (1950-1966)
 Maurice Abravanel
 Julius Baker
 Alfred Brendel
 Adrian Boult
 John Barbirolli
 Willi Boskovsky
 Jeanne-Marie Darre
 Netania Davrath
 Alfred Deller
 Mischa Elman
 Maureen Forrester
 Vladimir Golschmann
 Anton Heiller
 Antonio Janigro
 Charles Mackerras
 Jan Peerce
 Felix Prohaska
 Alexander Schneider
 Peter Serkin
 Leopold Stokowski
 Joseph Szigeti

Current artists

 Barenaked Ladies 
 Blue Giant 
 Bruce Hornsby 
 Chely Wright 
 Chris Isaak 
 Clairy Browne & The Bangin' Rackettes 
 Collective Soul
 Diane Schuur 
 The Gourds 
 Greg Laswell 
 Indigo Girls 
 Isobel Campbell 
 Lee DeWyze 
 The Living Sisters 
 Marc Broussard 
 Matt Nathanson 
 O.A.R.
 Ozomatli
 Parachute
 Robert Francis 
 Rodney Crowell 
 Shawn Mullins 
 Stephen Kellogg & The Sixers 
 Susanna Hoffs 
 Trevor Hall 
 Viva Voce

Former artists
(Partial list)

 Pat Martino
 Alisha
 Andrew McMahon in the Wilderness
 The Alternate Routes
 Eric Andersen
 Joan Baez
 BeauSoleil
 Blues Traveler
 Robert Bradley
 Alison Brown
 Sandy Bull
 Kimberly Caldwell
 Camper Van Beethoven
 Carbon Leaf
 Peter Case
 Don Williams
 Deana Carter
 Liam Clancy
 The Clancy Brothers
 Buck Clayton
 Larry Coryell
 James Cotton
 Joe Grushecky
 The Country Gentlemen
 Country Joe & the Fish
 Robert Cray
 Pee Wee Crayton
 Catie Curtis
 Erik Darling
 Vic Dickenson
 The Dillards
 Ramblin' Jack Elliott
 John Fahey
 Richard Fariña & Mimi Fariña
 Flashman
 Flogging Molly
 John Fogerty 
 Julia Fordham
 Bob Frank
 Kinky Friedman
 The Frost
 Steve Gillette
 Buddy Guy
 Merle Haggard 
 John Hammond
 Levon Helm 
 John Hiatt
 Big Walter Horton
 Cisco Houston
 Jesca Hoop
 Mississippi John Hurt
 J.B. Hutto
 Ian & Sylvia
 Indigenous
 Skip James
 Bert Jansch
 David Earle Johnson
 Joey + Rory
 Klezmer Conservatory Band
 Patty Larkin
 Live
 Dave Mallett
 Edwin McCain
 John McEuen
 Max Morath
 Nellie McKay
 Ramsay Midwood
 Charlie Musselwhite
 Phil Ochs
 Sinéad O'Connor
 Odetta
 Oregon
 Joan Osborne
 Tom Paxton
 Jan Peerce
 Perrey & Kingsley
 Gershon Kingsley
 Jean-Jacques Perrey
 Jim Kweskin
 Kim Richey
 Paul Robeson
 Linda Ronstadt
 The Rooftop Singers
 Otis Rush
 Jimmy Rushing
 Buffy Sainte-Marie
 Peter Schickele
 Mark Selby
 Shurman
 Mindy Smith
 Siegel-Schwall Band
 Patrick Sky
 Otis Spann
 Garrison Starr
 Big Mama Thornton
 Switchfoot
 Twilight 22
 The Vagrants
 Jerry Jeff Walker
 Peter Walker
 The Watson Twins
 Doc Watson
 The Weavers
 Junior Wells
 Hedy West
 David Wilcox
 Mason Williams
 Daphne Willis
 Yonder Mountain String Band
 The Young Tradition
 Zager and Evans

See also
 List of record labels
 Welk Music Group
 Ranwood Records
 Sugar Hill Records

References

American record labels
Blues record labels
Classical music record labels
Jazz record labels
Folk record labels
Reissue record labels
Record labels established in 1950
Bluegrass record labels
Concord Music Group